The Komediant is an Israeli documentary film of 2000, directed by Arnon Goldfinger and written by Oshra Schwartz. It focuses on the life and careers of the Burstein family of Yiddish theatre: Pesach Burstein, his wife Lillian Lux, his son Mike Burstyn and daughter Susan Burstein-Roth. Made in honor of the 100th birth anniversary of Pesach Burstein, it received the Israeli Academy's Best Documentary Award.

External links
 

2000 films
2000 documentary films
Documentary films about Jews and Judaism
Documentary films about theatre
Hebrew-language films
Israeli documentary films
Yiddish-language films
Yiddish theatre
Yiddish culture in Israel
2000s English-language films
2000 multilingual films
Israeli multilingual films